The 1981 Taça de Portugal Final was the final match of the 1980–81 Taça de Portugal, the 41st season of the Taça de Portugal, the premier Portuguese football cup competition organized by the Portuguese Football Federation (FPF). The match was played on 6 June 1981 at the Estádio Nacional in Oeiras, and opposed two Primeira Liga sides: Benfica and Porto. Benfica defeated Porto 3–1 to claim the Taça de Portugal for a seventeenth time.

In Portugal, the final was televised live on RTP. As a result of the Águias claiming both the league and cup double in the same season, cup runners-up Porto faced their cup final opponents in the 1981 Supertaça Cândido de Oliveira.

Match

Details

References

1983
Taca
S.L. Benfica matches
FC Porto matches